Lady Sings the Blues is the soundtrack to the Billie Holiday biopic of the same name, which starred Diana Ross in her 1972 screen debut. It became Ross' fourth #1 album (eventually selling over 2 million US copies), though the only one as a solo artist. It was certified gold in the UK for sales of over 100,000 copies. It was the fourth best-selling R&B album and fifth best-selling Pop album of 1973 in the US.

Music writers said Ross emulated Billie Holiday's voice while retaining her own individual sound.  This soundtrack album was the only Motown album to have a special designed label to match the album cover on the vinyl release, rather than Motown's usual "Map of Detroit" design. This label design would also turn up on the single releases from the soundtrack.

Track listing

Side one
"The Arrest" – 0:15
"Lady Sings the Blues" – 1:03
"Baltimore Brothel" – 0:25
"Billie Sneaks into Dean and Dean's/Swinging Uptown" – 0:49
"'Taint Nobody's Bizness If I Do" – 1:06
"Big Ben/C.C. Rider" – 1:06
"All of Me" – 2:19
"The Man I Love" – 2:27
"Them There Eyes" – 1:03
"Gardenias from Louis" – 2:03
"Cafe Manhattan/Had You Been Around/Love Theme" – 2:03

Side two
"Any Happy Home" – 0:37
"I Cried for You" – 0:37
"Billie and Harry/Don't Explain" – 0:37
"Mean to Me" – 1:18
"Fine and Mellow" – 0:45
"What a Little Moonlight Can Do" – 2:09
"Louis Visits Billie on Tour/Love Theme" – 0:45
"Cafe Manhattan Party" – 1:37
"Persuasion/'Taint Nobody's Bizness If I Do" – 3:48
"Agent's Office" – 1:09
"Our Love Is Here to Stay" – 2:01

Side three
"Fine and Mellow" – 2:54
"Lover Man" – 3:22
"You've Changed" – 2:34
"Gimme a Pigfoot (And a Bottle of Beer)" – 2:06
"Good Morning Heartache" – 2:21
"All of Me" – 2:04

Side four
"Love Theme" – 2:53
"My Man" – 3:26
"Don't Explain" – 2:10
"I Cried for You" – 2:13
"Strange Fruit" – 3:35
"God Bless the Child" – 2:42
"Closing Theme" – 1:08

Charts

Certifications

Personnel
Diana Ross - vocals
Gil Askey - conductor
Gil Askey, Benny Golson, Oliver Nelson - arrangements
Albert Aarons, William "Cat" Anderson, Bobby Bryant, Harry "Sweets" Edison, Teddy Buckner - trumpets
Georgie Auld, William "Buddy" Collette, Plas Johnson, Jack Nimitz, Marshall Royal, Ernie Watts - saxophone
George Bohanon, Jimmy Cleveland, Henry Coker, Grover Mitchell, Maurice Spears, John Ewing - trombones
Max Bennett, George "Red" Callender, Arthur Edwards - bass
John Collins - guitar, banjo
Earl Palmer, Jesse Sailes - drums
Don Abney, Gerald Wiggins, Chester Lane - piano
"Caughey" Roberts - clarinet, soprano saxophone

Production 

 Michel Legrand - composed, arranged, conductor
 Guy Costa - engineering and technical direction
 Larry Miles, Cal Harris, Bill Macmeekin, Dave Ramsey, Art Stewart, Russ Terrana - Mowest engineers
 Gordon Day, Dave Docendort, John Norman - Glen Glen engineers
 Katarina Pettersson - art direction
 John Le Prevost, Frank Frezzo - design
 Orlando Suero - photography
 Sandra Forney - graphic production
 Suzanne de Passe, Iris Gordy - edited, coordinated
 Tony Jones - creative assistance
 Berry Gordy - executive producer

See also
 Happy (Love Theme from Lady Sings the Blues)

References

Biographical film soundtracks
1972 soundtrack albums
Motown soundtracks
Diana Ross soundtracks
Albums arranged by Benny Golson
Albums arranged by Oliver Nelson
Albums arranged by Michel Legrand
Albums produced by Gil Askey
Vocal jazz soundtracks